Ethan Hammerton (born 25 September 2000) is a British racing driver currently competing in the 2022 Mini Challenge UK with Excelr8 Motorsport. He has previously competed in the British Touring Car Championship in 2018 with Team HARD. He stepped down to the Renault UK Clio Cup for 2019 with the same team.

Racing record

Complete British Touring Car Championship results
(key) (Races in bold indicate pole position – 1 point awarded just in first race; races in italics indicate fastest lap – 1 point awarded all races; * signifies that driver led race for at least one lap – 1 point given all races)

References

2000 births
Living people
British Touring Car Championship drivers
English racing drivers
British racing drivers
Renault UK Clio Cup drivers
Mini Challenge UK drivers